Babylon Springs is a 2006 EP by the Mountain Goats on the 4AD label. It was released as a CD and a digital download.

Track listing

Charts

References

2006 EPs
The Mountain Goats EPs